Events in the year 1997 in Cyprus.

Incumbents 

 President: Demetris Christofias
 President of the Parliament: Yiannakis Omirou

Events 
Ongoing – Cyprus dispute

 July 9–12: President Glafcos Clerides and his Turkish counterpart Rauf Denktaş held face-to-face talks with each other under U.N. auspices at Troutbeck, New York.

Deaths

References 

 
1990s in Cyprus
Cyprus
Cyprus
Cyprus
Years of the 21st century in Cyprus